World War II Combatives are techniques used in close quarters combat, including hand-to-hand fighting, advanced firearm point shooting methods, and weapons techniques (knife/bayonet/improvised weapons). They were taught to allied special forces in World War II by notable instructors such as Rex Applegate and William Ewart Fairbairn.

Background
World War II Combatives were rooted in the policing tactics employed by police forces in the Shanghai International Settlement, pioneers of the concept of SWAT police who operated in what was widely acknowledged as the most dangerous port city in the world at the time.

World War II
Upon returning to their countries of origin, veterans of the Shanghai Municipal Police were tasked with training allied World War II commandos and intelligence personnel including the British Commandos - SAS & SBS, the US/Canadian 1st Special Service Force ("Devil's Brigade"), the Office of Strategic Services (precursor to the CIA), the British Special Operation Executive, Marine Raider Units, and the US Army Rangers.

See also
Defendu
Defendo
Kapap
Krav Maga
Sambo

Bibliography

"Get Tough" by William Ewart Fairbairn
"Kill or Get Killed" by Rex Applegate
"Cold Steel" by John Styers
"Do or Die: A Supplementary Manual on Individual Combat" A.J. Drexel-Biddle

References

Combat
Military personnel
World War II
Hybrid martial arts
North American martial arts
Martial arts in the United States
European martial arts